Niophis bucki is a species of beetle in the family Cerambycidae. It was described by Martins and Monné in 1973.

References

Ectenessini
Beetles described in 1973